Santiago District is one of the several districts that make up Paraguari department, which is located in the central region of Paraguay. The department's capital city is the city of Paraguari, which is located approximately 70 km (43 miles) from Asuncion, the country's capital city.

Santiago District covers an area of approximately 198 km² (76 mi²) and is located in the western part of Paraguari department. According to the 2019 population estimate, the district had a population of around 7,000 people. The district is mainly rural, with agriculture being the main economic activity.

Some of the attractions in Santiago District and its surrounding areas include the Paraguari Hills, the Ytay Mountains, and the Ybycui National Park. Additionally, there are several historic sites and landmarks, including the Church of San Francisco, which was built in the 18th century and is considered a national monument.

Populated places in the Misiones Department
Districts of Misiones Department